American rapper Cardi B has released one studio album, three mixtapes, 38 singles (including 24 as a featured artist), and 17 music videos (as a lead artist). According to the RIAA, she has sold  100 million equivalent units in the United States across albums, singles, and mixtapes, making her the 6th best-selling female digital artist in the country. Her debut album Invasion of Privacy was the best selling female rap album of the 2010s according to The Recording Academy. It also became the most streamed female rap album on Spotify history. According to IFPI, "Girls Like You" was the 5th best-selling single of 2018 worldwide, selling 11.9 million units that year alone.

In 2015, she embarked on a musical career, after amassing a large Internet fan base, following her appearances on VH1's Love & Hip Hop: New York. On March 7, 2016, Cardi B released her first full-length mixtape, Gangsta Bitch Music, Vol. 1 with KSR Group. On September 12, 2016, KSR Group released the compilation, Underestimated: The Album, which is a collaboration between KSR Group artists Cardi B, Hood Celebrity, SwiftOnDemand, Cashflow Harlem and Josh X. It was previously released only to attendees of their US tour. On January 20, 2017, Cardi B released her second full-length mixtape as the second installment to her Gangsta Bitch Music series, which spawned the single "Bronx Season".

In February 2017, Cardi B signed her first solo major label recording contract with Atlantic Records. Cardi B's first single for Atlantic, titled "Bodak Yellow", proved to be a success, becoming a crossover hit single, when it reached number one on the US Billboard Hot 100 chart. On the Hot 100 chart dated October 1, 2017, Cardi B claimed the top spot becoming the first female rapper to do so with a solo song since Lauryn Hill in 1998. On April 6, 2018, Cardi B released her debut studio album Invasion of Privacy, which topped the US Billboard 200, received a triple platinum certification by the Recording Industry Association of America (RIAA), and became the longest-charting album by a female rapper. She became the first female artist to have all tracks from an album certified gold or higher by the RIAA, and the first artist overall to have all the tracks certified platinum or higher. Her single "I Like It", with Bad Bunny and J Balvin, made her the first female rapper with multiple number one songs on the Hot 100, and her collaboration with Maroon 5, "Girls Like You", extended the record, also making her the female rapper with most cumulative weeks at number one. "Bodak Yellow" made Cardi B the first female rapper to have a song certified Diamond by the RIAA, a record which she has since extended to three Diamond-certified songs. Debuting in 2017, she was Billboards 35th Artist of the 2010s. "WAP", the lead single of her second album, became her fourth chart-topper and made her the first female rapper to achieve Hot 100 number one singles in two different decades (2010s and 2020s). "Up", her fifth number one single on the Hot 100, made her the only female rapper to top the chart with multiple solo songs.

Studio albums

Mixtapes

Singles

As lead artist

As featured artist

Promotional singles

Other charted songs

Guest appearances

Music videos

As lead artist

As featured artist

Notes

References

External links
 Official website
 Cardi B at AllMusic
 
 

Hip hop discographies
Discographies of American artists
Discography